The Gloucester 19 is an American trailerable sailboat that was designed by Stuart Windley and Harry R. Sindle as a day sailer and first built in 1983.

The Gloucester 19 is a daysailer development of the Lockley-Newport 19 and the Gloucester 20. The design was later developed into the Quickstep 19.

Production
The design was built by Gloucester Yachts, which was formerly Lockley Newport Boats, in the United States. The boat was first built in 1983, but production had ended by the time that the company went out of business in 1988.

Design
The Gloucester 19 is a recreational keelboat, built predominantly of fiberglass, with wood trim. It has a fractional sloop rig, a raked stem, a plumb transom, a transom-hung rudder controlled by a tiller and a fixed fin keel or swing keel. It displaces  and carries  of ballast.

The boat is normally fitted with a small  outboard motor for docking and maneuvering.

The design has sleeping accommodation for two people, with a short double "V"-berth in the bow cabin and two straight settees in the main cabin. The head is centered under the "V"-berth in the bow cabin.

Operational history
In a 2010 review Steve Henkel wrote, "this boat ... was available with either centerboard ... or fixed keel (3' 3" draft). Best features: The Gloucester version of this boat is at the lower end of the price scale (but part of this may be tied in with an only so-so level of construction quality). Worst features: Although the Space Index indicates a large available volume for stowage, in fact space is limited to bins under berths and two tiny counters separating the V-berth from quarter berths. The V-berth is short. For some reason there was no permanent backstay on some models (as there is on every one of her comp[etitor]s), resulting in a relatively loose and insufficient jib stay tension for best efficiency upwind. Construction quality is so-so at best. Critics point out a poorly finished hull-deck joint and misaligned chainplates, among other problems."

See also
List of sailing boat types

References

Keelboats
1980s sailboat type designs
Sailing yachts
Trailer sailers
Sailboat type designs by Stuart Windley
Sailboat type designs by Harry R. Sindle
Sailboat types built by Gloucester Yachts